Antaeotricha basiferella is a moth in the family Depressariidae. It was described by Francis Walker in 1864. It is found in Amazonas, Brazil.

Adults are brownish cinereous (ash gray), the forewings with a brown oblique basal streak, and with a brown discal point at two-thirds of the length.

References

Moths described in 1864
basiferella
Moths of South America